Chris Juan Jones (born June 26, 1964) is a former American football center who played one season with the New York Giants of the National Football League. He played college football at Delaware State University and attended East Orange High School in East Orange, New Jersey. He was also a member of the New York Knights of the Arena Football League.

References

External links
Just Sports Stats

Living people
1964 births
East Orange High School alumni
Players of American football from New Jersey
Players of American football from Norfolk, Virginia
American football centers
African-American players of American football
Delaware State Hornets football players
New York Giants players
New York Knights (arena football) players
Sportspeople from East Orange, New Jersey
21st-century African-American people
20th-century African-American sportspeople